Gulzar Chahal is an Indian film actor and producer. He played the role of Roop in Jag Jeondeyan De Mele. He has also co-produced "Heer-Ranjha",starring Harbhajan Mann and Neeru Bajwa. He would be seen in the lead role in a Bollywood movie-"I Am Singh"(directed by Puneet Issar), in which Gulzar plays the lead role of a turbaned Sikh. The story is on mistaken identity and hate crime on Sikhs in the US., after the 9/11 tragedy. The film is inspired by real life incidents. Female actors in major roles would be Tulip Joshi and Brooke Johnston (Miss UK Universe, 2005).

Gulzar was decorated with 'The Best Producer Award', January this year.

Personal life

His father, S. Harinder Singh Chahal has been a much decorated police officer with the Punjab Police and has recently retired as a Deputy Inspector General of Police (DIG).

Sports

He played cricket for India (Under-15) teams alongside the likes of Reetinder Singh Sodhi and Mohammad Kaif. He opened the bowling for India against Pakistan in the Lombard Under-15s Challenge Cup. The Indian team won the match by 4 wickets at Lords.

He is from 1997 batch from Yadavindra Public School, Patiala, Punjab, India.

Filmography

References

External links
 

Male actors in Punjabi cinema
Living people
Year of birth missing (living people)
21st-century Indian male actors